The Waltham transmitting station is a broadcasting and telecommunications facility
at Waltham-on-the-Wolds, 5 miles (8 km) north-east of Melton Mowbray. It sits inside the Waltham civil parish near Stonesby, in the district of Melton, Leicestershire, UK. It has a  guyed steel tubular mast. The main structure height to the top of the steelwork is 290.8 metres (954 ft), with the UHF television antennas contained within a GRP shroud mounted on top.

Construction

First structure
The first mast was built in 1966. On 16 November 1966, it collapsed. Parts of the wreckage are still in use as pig shelters. It had been built by the British Insulated Cables Construction Company. It was to have begun broadcasts in the summer of 1967.

Second structure
The structure was rebuilt in 1968 by the BBC. This delayed its first transmissions until 31 August 1968 of BBC2 only. It broadcast ITV from February 1970 and BBC1 from August 1970. On 9 April 1970, the whole region lost the signal when an excavator damaged the station's main cable. The mast was one of three similar types built at the same time by the BBC, with Mendip and Bilsdale.

It is a shorter version of the second Emley Moor transmitter which collapsed whilst broadcasting on 19 March 1969, due to the weight of ice on the structural cables. The Waltham mast has four sets of stay levels as opposed to the six of the former Emley mast. The latter was identical to the current 385m high Belmont mast, both built by the ITA.

It is east of the A607 between Grantham and Melton Mowbray.

Coverage
The mast was originally built to provide BBC2 (on the new UHF 625 lines system) to the East Midlands. It became the main mast for ITV's Central East Midlands from 1982 and BBC East Midlands from 1991. Previously it had carried broadcasts from Birmingham. NICAM was transmitted from 31 March 1992.

It is now the main TV transmitter for all digital terrestrial channels covering the East Midlands, predominantly including most of Leicestershire, Rutland, Nottinghamshire and Derbyshire. It can also be received in parts of Norfolk, Cambridgeshire, Huntingdonshire, Northamptonshire, Warwickshire, Staffordshire, Yorkshire and Lincolnshire. It is owned and operated by Arqiva.

Digital TV
Waltham first broadcast digital TV on 15 November 1998. In July 2007 it was confirmed by Ofcom that at DSO (Digital Switchover) Waltham would be transmitting five - of the six - MUXes within its original C/D group. For reception of all 6 MUXES a wideband is required.
When Waltham undertakes its 700MHz clearance, between February and March 2020, it will become an A group - excluding MUXES 7 and 8 which are due to be switched off before the end of 2022 anyway (see graph).

Relay stations
The two most powerful relays are at Nottingham (just west of the M1 J26) and at Stanton Moor (near Bakewell). The Nottingham relay at Kimberley began on 30 March 1973, following tests from late February 1973

The area immediately to the north west of the latter transmitter is the meeting point between the Winter Hill, Emley Moor, Sutton Coldfield, and Waltham broadcasting regions and this is why just north-west of Bakewell, the filler transmitters are BBC North West. Stanton Moor transmitter feeds the Darley Dale site, which was Britain's 1000th television relay station.

Transmitted services

Analogue radio

Digital radio (DAB)

Digital television

On 4 March 2020, the following channels came into use as a result of the 700MHz clearance programme.

Before 700MHz clearance

Prior to 4 March 2020, the following channels were used.

Before switchover

Analogue television

Analogue television is no longer transmitted from Waltham. BBC Two closed on UHF 64 on 17 August 2011. ITV1 was moved into its frequency at the time and the BBC A multiplex began transmitting on UHF 61. The remaining four analogue channels were switched off on 31 August.

See also
 List of tallest structures in the world – 300 to 400 metres
 List of tallest structures in the United Kingdom
 List of radio stations in the United Kingdom

Notes

References

External links
 Info and pictures of Waltham transmitter including historical power/frequency changes and present co-receivable transmitters.
 The Transmission Gallery: photographs, coverage maps and information
 Waltham Transmitter at thebigtower.com
 Waltham at UK Free TV

Relay stations
 Ashbourne on Wyaston Road
 Ashford-in-the-Water off the A6
 Belper on Firestone Hill near Hazelwood
 Birchover at Uppertown Farm towards Winster
 Bolehill near the National Stone Centre
 Darley Dale 
 Eastwood next to Morrisons
 Little Eaton next to the A38
 Matlock at High Tor, east of the A6
 Nottingham in Strelley, Broxtowe
 Parwich towards Tissington 
 Stamford on Barnack Road next to Stamford High School
 Stanton Moor at Stanton in Peak next to the Nine Ladies

Buildings and structures in Leicestershire
Transmitter sites in England
Mass media in the East Midlands
Borough of Melton
1968 establishments in England
1968 in British television
Buildings and structures completed in 1968